Apteropeda is a genus of flea beetle in the family Chrysomelidae.

References

Alticini
Chrysomelidae genera
Beetles described in 1839
Taxa named by Louis Alexandre Auguste Chevrolat
Beetles of North Africa
Beetles of Europe